Éric Geoffroy (born 1956) is a French philosopher, islamologist, writer and scholar in the Sufi studies teaching at the University of Strasbourg. He is an affiliate of the Alawiya Sufi Brotherhood.

Thought

He is a critic of the notion of a Clash of Civilizations, which he transcends into a Dialogue of Traditions

Bibliography 

 2010 : Abd el-kader : un spirituel dans la modernité (direction), Albouraq, Paris.
 2009 : L'islam sera spirituel ou ne sera plus, Seuil, Paris.
 2009 : Le soufisme, voie intérieure de l'islam, Seuil (coll. Points-Sagesses) : version poche de Initiation au soufisme, éd. Fayard, 2003.
 2009 : Le grand livre des prénoms arabes, Albouraq / Albin Michel, Paris (en collaboration avec Néfissa Geoffroy).
 2005 : Une voie soufie dans le monde : la Shâdhiliyya. actes du colloque organisé par E. Geoffroy à la Bibliotheca Alexandrina en avril 03. Paris, Maisonneuve & Larose, 30 contributeurs, 550 p.
 2003 : Initiation au soufisme, éd. Fayard, Paris. Réédité en 2004 et en 2007. Traductions en arabe (chez Kalima Translation, Abou Dhabi – Beyrouth, 2010) et en anglais (World Wisdom, USA, 2010).
 2000 : L'instant soufi, Actes Sud.
 1998 : La sagesse des maîtres soufis, éditions Grasset, Paris : présentation et traduction des Latâ'if al-minan d'Ibn 'Atâ' Allâh. Traduit en espagnol (Mandala Ediciones, Madrid, 2008).
 1997 : Jihâd et contemplation - Vie et enseignement d'un soufi au temps des croisades, éditions Dervy, Paris. (réédition corrigée chez Albouraq en 2003).
 1995 : Le soufisme en Egypte et en Syrie sous les derniers Mamelouks et les premiers Ottomans : orientations spirituelles et enjeux culturels, thèse publiée par l'Institut Français d'Etudes Arabes de Damas, Damas-Paris, 595 p. (disponible à la librairie de l'Institut du Monde Arabe, et bientôt on line sur le site de l'IFPO).

References

1956 births
Living people
French Sufis
French philosophers
Islamic philosophers
Writers  from Belfort
Academic staff of the University of Strasbourg
21st-century Muslim scholars of Islam
Converts to Islam
French male non-fiction writers
20th-century Muslim scholars of Islam